Aveleda may refer to the following places in Portugal:

 Aveleda (Braga), a civil parish in the municipality of Braga
 Aveleda (Bragança), a civil parish in the municipality Bragança
 Aveleda (Lousada), a civil parish in the municipality of Lousada
 Aveleda (Vila do Conde), a civil parish in the municipality of Vila do Conde

Other uses:
 Aveleda (winery), a winery in the Vinho Verde region of Portugal